Maulvi Sadar Azam or Sadr Azam is an Afghan Taliban politician and Islamic scholar who is currently serving as acting Deputy Minister of Agriculture and Livestock since 22 September 2021 alongside Attaullah Omari and Shamsuddin Pahlawan. He belongs to Paktia.

In November 2021 Sadar Azam met with officials of the Turkish Humanitarian Aid Foundation INSANI YARDIM VAKFI (IHH) which launched a campaign under the slogan "Don't leave me alone" and has donated 100 tons of improved wheat seeds to Afghanistan.

References

Year of birth missing (living people)
Living people
People from Paktia Province
Taliban government ministers of Afghanistan